Brandon D. Bollig (born January 31, 1987) is an American former professional ice hockey player. An undrafted player, Bollig signed with the Chicago Blackhawks organization in 2010 after playing college hockey for St. Lawrence University.  He made his NHL debut in 2012 and was a member of Chicago's Stanley Cup championship team in 2013. The Calgary Flames acquired Bollig in a draft-day trade on June 28, 2014.

Playing career
As a youth, Bollig played in the 2001 Quebec International Pee-Wee Hockey Tournament with the St. Louis Blues minor ice hockey team.

Bollig played high school hockey for Francis Howell North High School in St. Charles, Missouri, where he graduated in 2005 with a 3.4 grade point average. During his junior year of high school, he also tried out for the St. Louis Jr. Blues Tier III Junior B team, but was cut. Bollig tried out again the following year and made the team for the 2004-05 season. After spending one season with the Jr. Blues and graduating from high school, Bollig moved up to the United States Hockey League (USHL) to join the Lincoln Stars.

Bollig played three seasons of tier I junior ice hockey with the Lincoln Stars of the USHL between 2005 and 2008. He appeared in 173 games for the Stars and recorded 37 goals and 36 assists in that time, as well as 593 penalty minutes (PIM). He finished second in the USHL in penalties in both 2006–07 and 2007–08 with 207 and 211 PIM respectively. He then attended St. Lawrence University where he played two seasons of NCAA Division I college hockey with the Saints.  After recording 13 points as a freshman in 2008–09, Bollig finished fourth in team scoring with 25 points and led the team with 83 PIM.

The Chicago Blackhawks lured Bollig out of university following his sophomore season and signed him to a professional contract in 2010. The Blackhawks assigned him to their American Hockey League (AHL) affiliate, the Rockford IceHogs to complete the 2009–10 season; Bollig made his professional debut on April 6, 2010, and scored his first professional goal four nights later against the San Antonio Rampage. He played the entire 2010–11 AHL season with the IceHogs, and remained in Rockford for the majority of the following campaign.

Chicago recalled Bollig late in the 2011–12 NHL season to serve as a replacement for enforcer John Scott, who was traded to the New York Rangers. Bollig made his NHL debut on February 29, 2012, against the Toronto Maple Leafs; he also recorded his first fight, against Luke Schenn. He appeared in 18 regular season games with the Blackhawks. He was held pointless, but recorded 58 PIM. In the 2012 Stanley Cup Playoffs, Bollig appeared in four games in the team's first round match-up against the Phoenix Coyotes and scored his first NHL goal on April 14, a game-tying marker against goaltender Mike Smith in the second game of the series.

Bollig returned to Rockford to begin the 2012–13 AHL season. He appeared in 35 games and recorded 9 points for the IceHogs before earning a recall to Chicago, and his 157 PIM was second in the AHL at that time. He played 25 games with Chicago, again held pointless, and led the team with 51 PIM. Bollig appeared in only five post-season games, but was a member of the team when it defeated the Boston Bruins to claim the 2013 Stanley Cup championship.  He was the first native of the St. Louis region to win the Cup.

The first regular season goal of Bollig's career came in Chicago's opening game of the 2013–14 season, October 1, 2013, against Braden Holtby of the Washington Capitals. In his first full season in the NHL, Bollig appeared in all 82 games for Chicago, scored 7 goals and added 7 assists. The season was a transitional one for Bollig as he expanded on his a role as a pure enforcer and placed added focus on becoming a defensive forward on Chicago's fourth line. Chicago signed Bollig to a three-year contract extension worth $1.25 million per year late in the season, however the Blackhawks were forced to make deals to remain compliant with the NHL salary cap in the off-season. On June 28, 2014, Chicago sent Bollig to the Calgary Flames in exchange for a third round selection at the 2014 NHL Entry Draft.

On July 4, 2017, Bollig signed as a free agent to a one-year, two-way contract worth $650,000 with the San Jose Sharks. He was assigned to play with AHL affiliate, the San Jose Barracuda to begin the 2017–18 season. After appearing in 45 games with the Barracuda, on February 25, 2018, Bollig was traded by the Sharks alongside Troy Grosenick to the Nashville Predators in exchange for a sixth round draft pick in 2018.

As a free agent over the summer and into the mid-point of the 2018–19 season, Bollig announced his retirement from his 8-year professional career on January 16, 2018.

Personal
Bollig married Dannah Lakin on August 4, 2018 in Chicago, IL. 
Bollig was cast as Will Cross, age 12, in the 2002 film Defiance, notable for also including former St. Louis Blues enforcer Tony Twist in the cast.

Career statistics

References

External links

1987 births
American men's ice hockey left wingers
American male child actors
Calgary Flames players
Chicago Blackhawks players
Ice hockey people from St. Louis
Lincoln Stars players
Living people
Milwaukee Admirals players
People from St. Charles, Missouri
Rockford IceHogs (AHL) players
St. Lawrence Saints men's ice hockey players
San Jose Barracuda players
Stanley Cup champions
Stockton Heat players
Undrafted National Hockey League players